Juan Osvaldo Lagares (born March 17, 1989) is a Dominican professional baseball center fielder who is a free agent. He has played in Major League Baseball (MLB) for the New York Mets and Los Angeles Angels, and in the KBO League for the SSG Landers. Known for his defensive prowess, he won the National League Gold Glove Award in 2014.

Early life
Lagares grew up in a cool, mountainous area in Constanza, Dominican Republic. There were few baseball facilities or teams in the area so Lagares grew up playing softball. He has credited his arm strength to his background in throwing the larger, heavier softball. Lagares did not transition to playing baseball until he was already a teenager. After only seven or eight months practicing at a baseball academy, he was signed as a shortstop by the New York Mets.

Professional career

New York Mets
Lagares was signed by the New York Mets as a non-drafted free agent on May 5, 2006. Lagares was moved from shortstop to the outfield in 2009. He was assigned to the DSL Mets in 2006, wherein 57 games, he hit .255/.339/.412 with 18 XBH, 33 RBI and 12 SB.

In 2007, Lagares was promoted to Single-A Savannah, wherein 83 games, he hit .210/.262/.317 with 20 XBH, 16 RBI, and 11 SB.

After an arm issue occurred, his 2008 debut, with Savannah, happened in late June. After 46 games with Savannah, Lagares was demoted to Low-A Brooklyn in the middle of August. In 65 total games, he hit .253/.284/.352 with 3 HR and 24 RBI.

In 2009, Lagares began the season with Savannah, but a wrist injury suffered in late May ended most of his season. He came back in September after a rehab stint with the GCL Mets. In 53 total games, he hit .266/.297/.323 with 14 RBI and 10 SB.
After the 2009 season, he played for Águilas Cibaeñas of the Dominican Professional Baseball League(LIDOM). 

In 2010, Lagares began the season with Savannah, and after hitting .300/.318/.459 with 5 HR, 39 RBI and 18 SB in 67 games, he was promoted to High-A St. Lucie, but was limited to 33 games thereafter a fractured ankle ended his season on July 28.

In 2011, Lagares began in St. Lucie, before being promoted to Double-A Binghamton. In 120 games total, he hit .349/.383/.500 with 9 HR, 71 RBI and 15 SB. Lagares was added to the Mets 40 man roster on November 18, 2011.
After the 2011 season, he played for Cibaeñas of the LIDOM.

In 2012,  Lagares played with Binghamton, wherein 130 games, he hit .283/.334/.389 with 4 HR, 48 RBI and 21 SB.
After the 2012 season, he played for Cibaeñas of the LIDOM.

In 2013, Lagares began the season with Triple-A Las Vegas as their center fielder, where he played in 17 games before getting called to New York. On April 23, Lagares was called up by the Mets with Kirk Nieuwenhuis being sent down to the 51s. Lagares made his debut on the same day against the Los Angeles Dodgers coming in as a part of a double switch in the fifth inning. In the bottom of the seventh inning he recorded his first hit, a single, off Paco Rodriguez. Lagares hit his first major league home run on May 19, against Travis Wood of the Chicago Cubs at Wrigley Field. For the week of July 15–21, 2013, Lagares won the NL Player of the Week Award. In that week, Lagares hit .700 with a home run and 5 RBI. In 121 games for the Mets, he hit .242/.281/.352 with 4 HR and 34 RBI. Lagares had a .983 fielding percentage, as well as leading the MLB in assists at center field (14), defensive runs saved (26) and the NL in Range Factor/9 innings at center field (2.98). On August 20, Lagares ranked second among center fielders in Defensive Runs Saved with 20 behind Carlos Gómez with 27. In September, he was named MLB's best defender for the month of August. He led the majors with 12 defensive runs saved and led the National League, and ranked second in the majors, in outfield assists with 12. He set the Mets franchise rookie record with 15 outfield assists. His 3.5 dWAR was second only to Brewers outfielder Carlos Gomez (4.6) among National League center fielders. He was named as the Mets best defensive player during Wilson's Defensive Player of the Year Awards. Lagares finished the 2013 season appearing in 121 games with a batting average of .242 in 392 at-bats in 421 plate appearances while compiling 95 hits, 34 RBIs, 4 home runs, 20 walks, 35 runs scored and striking out 96 times.

After the 2013 season, he played for Cibaeñas of the LIDOM. In December, he ultimately winning the Rookie of the Year award. He hit .342 with one HR, 16 RBI, five stolen bases and seven walks in 114 at-bats.

In 2014, Lagares made the Mets' roster for Opening Day. On April 14, he left due to an injury during a game against the Arizona Diamondbacks. Lagares grabbed his hamstring after beating out a double play in the seventh inning. The next day he was placed on the 15-day disabled list with a pulled right hamstring. He was batting .314 with a .345 OBP, five extra base hits and seven RBIs in the 13 games. He was recalled from rehabbing with the 51s on May 1. In mid-May, Mets fans on social media sites such as Twitter and Facebook became frustrated with manager Terry Collins sitting Lagares on the bench since coming off the disabled list. As of May 16, he was benched for the fourth time in five games. Mets fans soon started a campaign called #FreeLagares to express their anger over him being benched. Although Lagares had been struggling since coming back from the disabled list, however his defensive capability and clutch hitting was touted as being reason enough for him to be put in the lineup. On June 2, he was placed again on the disabled list with a right intercostal strain. On June 26, Wilmer Flores was sent down to the 51s to make room for Lagares coming of the disabled list. On September 23, he was shut down for the rest of the season with a sprained elbow. At the end of the season he improved his hitting over the past season, increasing his average by nearly 40 points, from .242 to .281. Lagares finished the 2014 season appearing in 116 games with a batting average of .281 in 416 at-bats in 452 plate appearances while compiling 117 hits, 47 RBIs, 4 home runs, 20 walks, 46 runs scored and striking out 87 times. On November 4, it was announced that he had won his first Gold Glove Award. He was the third outfielder in franchise history to win a Gold Glove award, the others being Tommie Agee (1970) and Carlos Beltrán (2006-08). He also won the Fielding Bible Award as the statistically best defensive center fielder in the National League.

On April 2, 2015, Lagares and the Mets agreed to a four-year extension worth $23 million which will run from 2016 through 2019. The Mets have a $9.5 million option for 2020, with a $500,000 buyout. Lagares made the team out of spring training as the starting center fielder. On July 31, the Mets traded for Yoenis Céspedes,  who would play center regularly throughout the season. Lagares moved to backup outfield role, regularly coming in as defensive substitution late in the game. Lagares finished the 2015 season appearing in 143 games batting .259./.289/.358 in 441 at-bats in 465 plate appearances while compiling 114 hits, 41 RBIs, 6 home runs, 16 walks, 47 runs scored and striking out 87 times. In the NLDS against the Los Angeles Dodgers, he hit .429 in 4 games while compiling 3 hits, 2 doubles, 1 walk and scoring 3 runs. In the NLCS against the Chicago Cubs, he hit .333 in 4 games with 2 hits, 2 runs scored, 1 stolen base and striking out 2 times. In the World Series against the Kansas City Royals, he hit .300 in all 5 games with 3 hits, 2 runs scored, 1 stolen base and striking out 1 time.
After the 2015 season, he played for Cibaeñas of the LIDOM.

In 2016, Lagares made the Mets' Opening Day Roster, serving as a backup outfielder, pinch hitter and defensive substitution. On June 16 the Mets placed Lagares on the disabled list due to a sprained left thumb he had suffered while making a diving catch in a game on June 4. He again went on the 15-day disabled list  from July 29-September 16 for his sprained left thumb, and then had surgery on August 1 to repair a torn ligament in his thumb. For the season, he batted .239/.301/.380.

In 2017, Lagares battled injuries but contributed to the Mets with 58 starts and 252 at bats. He hit .250/.296/.365 for the year and participated in a deep and injury-riddled outfield in 2017.

On May 17, 2018, Lagares tore the plantar plate in his toe while attempting to catch a fly ball, requiring surgery. He missed the remainder of the 2018 season due to this.
After the 2018 season, he played for Cibaeñas of the LIDOM.

Lagares became a free agent on November 1, 2019, when the Mets declined his contract option for the 2020 season. After the 2019 season, he played for Cibaeñas of the LIDOM.

San Diego Padres
On February 10, 2020, Lagares signed a minor league deal with the San Diego Padres. Lagares elected free agency on July 14, 2020.

Second Stint with Mets
On July 22, 2020, Lagares signed a minor league deal with the New York Mets organization. On August 25, 2020, Lagares was selected to the active roster. Lagares was designated for assignment on August 28. Lagares was outrighted on August 30, but elected free agency.
After the 2020 season, he played for Cibaeñas of the Dominican Professional Baseball League. He has also played for Dominican Republic in the 2021 Caribbean Series.

Los Angeles Angels
On February 7, 2021, Lagares signed a minor league contract with the Los Angeles Angels organization that included an invitation to Spring Training. On March 31, 2021, Lagares was selected to the 40-man roster. Lagares finished 2021 hitting .236/.266/.372 in 112 games. On May 8, 2022, Lagares returned to the Angels on a minor league contract, being assigned to Triple-A Salt Lake. 

On May 26, 2022, Lagares' contract was selected by the Angels. He made his season debut that day against the Toronto Blue Jays. In 20 games, Lagares batted .183/.210/.480 before being designated for assignment on June 24, 2022. On June 29, 2022, Lagares declined his outright minor league assignment and elected free agency.

SSG Landers
On July 8, 2022, Lagares signed with the SSG Landers of the KBO League on a 1-year, $495K contract. He became a free agent after the 2022 season.

Personal life
Lagares had a son, Juan, Jr., in September 2013 and is not married.

References

External links

1989 births
Living people
Águilas Cibaeñas players
Binghamton Mets players
Binghamton Rumble Ponies players
Brooklyn Cyclones players
Dominican Republic expatriate baseball players in the United States
Dominican Summer League Mets players
Gold Glove Award winners
Gulf Coast Mets players
Las Vegas 51s players
Los Angeles Angels players
Major League Baseball center fielders
Major League Baseball players from the Dominican Republic
Major League Baseball right fielders
New York Mets players
People from La Vega Province
Peoria Javelinas players
Savannah Sand Gnats players
St. Lucie Mets players